Montana Highway 5 (MT 5) is a  state highway connecting with North Dakota's Highway 5, the 337 mile long ND highway. MT 5 runs from the ND border to Scobey, Montana. It was designated in 1939. The road closely follows the topographic contours of the land and, in the extreme winter climate of northeastern Montana, this often leads to road closures due to drifting snow.

Major intersections

References 

005